Feodor Ivanovich Vilesov (13 November 1925 – 8 February 1978) was a Soviet experimental physicist whose main contributions are in the field of chemical  physics.

Education and early life 
Vilesov was born in Belyukovo village near Kudymkar, in Komi-Permyak Okrug (autonomous national district), Perm region, Russian SFSR, Soviet Union, on November 13, 1925, to a couple of: Ivan Ilvich Vilesov and Vassa Vasilievna Vilesova. During 1943 -1950 he served in the Soviet Army. In 1950 he entered the Department of Physics, Leningrad State University, from which he graduated with an honorable diploma (master's degree) in 1955. He continued with his Ph. D. studies at the Institute of Physics, Leningrad State University, in the department of photonics led by Professor A. N. Terenin and in 1959 he defended his thesis “The Study of Photoionization of vapors of organic molecules and interrogation of the influence of adsorbed layers on photoelectric Emission from Semiconductor Catalysts”. He obtained his Doctor of Physical and Mathematical Sciences (a "higher doctorate") degree in 1966 for a thesis on the development of photoelectron spectroscopy in the gas phase and molecular solids entitled: “Photoionization of Organic Molecules”

Career 
From 1955 to 1978, he worked at the Institute for Physics of the Leningrad State University. Since 1964, he was the head of the department of photonics (photochemistry). In 1967 he becomes a professor in physics at Leningrad State University. In 1977-1978 he served as the dean of sciences of the Leningrad State University.

In a series of works in 1960–1962, Vilesov and his colleagues performed the first experiments on Ultraviolet Photoelectron Spectroscopy (UPS) of molecular solids and gases. Since then Ultraviolet Photoelectron Spectroscopy has been widely applied to study valence energy levels and chemical bonding, especially the bonding character of molecular orbitals.

Honors and awards 
Vilesov was awarded the USSR State Prize in 1985, —for the development of the method of photoelectron spectroscopy and its application in science and technology, published in 1961–1985.

Personal life 
Vilesov was the son of Ivan Ivanovich Vilesov (1906-1967) and Vassa Vasilievna (1905-1984). He was married to Vera Konstantinovna Adamchuk (1933-2016) and had 1 child, Andrey Feodorovich Vilesov.

He past away on 8 February 1978 at the age of 52.

References 

1925 births
1978 deaths
Soviet physicists
Experimental physicists
Soviet inventors